Amauris hyalites is a butterfly in the family Nymphalidae. It is found in southern Cameroon, Bioko, Gabon, Angola, the Democratic Republic of Congo, western Tanzania and western Zambia. The habitat consists of low to medium altitude forests.

Adult males are attracted to wet sand.

The larvae feed on Asclepiadaceae species.

References

Seitz, A. Die Gross-Schmetterlinge der Erde 13: Die Afrikanischen Tagfalter. Plate XIII 25

Butterflies described in 1874
Amauris
Butterflies of Africa
Taxa named by Arthur Gardiner Butler